Bantock is a surname. Notable people with the surname include:

Albert Baldwin Bantock (1862–1938), English politician
Granville Bantock (1868–1946), British classical composer
Nick Bantock (born 1949), British artist and writer
Thomas Bantock (1823–1895), English businessman and politician

See also
Bantock House Museum and Park, museum in Wolverhampton, England